Babybird are an English rock band formed by songwriter and multi-instrumentalist Stephen Jones, who has been releasing music since 1995. While Jones' early solo work was released under the "Baby Bird" name, the altered "Babybird" was first used to distinguish the full band line-up that has changed often over the years. However, in recent years, Jones has recorded many of the Babybird albums himself, in addition to recording as a solo artist, and under various aliases including Death of the Neighbourhood, Trucker, Black Reindeer, Deluder, Arthritis Kid and others.

Stephen Jones started writing and recording songs at home and his first collection of these demos, I Was Born a Man, was released in July 1995 using the name Baby Bird. He formed a band in order to tour and promote this work. In 1996, Babybird signed to Echo Records and their first single was released in July 1996. Babybird were dropped from their record label in 2000 after their third album, Bugged, had poor sales. The band then split. Jones continued on his own, writing fiction, releasing solo work and created the score for the film Blessed (2004). In October 2005, the band reformed with three members and created the album Between My Ears There Is Nothing But Music, released in September 2006. They went on tour in November 2009 and then split again in 2013. After a number of Babybird releases on Bandcamp from 2015, Jones took the band back out on tour in late 2017 with a new line up. A compilation album Happy Stupid Nothing was released in 2019, featuring a selection of Babybird tracks from 2015 onwards.

Career 
Jones had begun writing songs and recording home demos as part of an experimental theatre group in Nottingham. A collection of these demos, I Was Born a Man, was released in July 1995, under the name Baby Bird. He recruited a band made up of Huw Chadbourn (keyboards), Robert Gregory (drums), John Pedder (bass) and Luke Scott (guitar), in order to tour and promote his work.

Commercial release 
During 1995, two further albums of demo recordings were released under the name Babybird (Bad Shave and Fatherhood) and two in 1996 (The Happiest Man Alive and Dying Happy). Babybird were signed to Echo Records (a division of the Chrysalis Group), and the first authentic single, a full-band recording of "Goodnight", which had appeared in demo form on Fatherhood, was released in July 1996, becoming a minor hit in the UK Singles Chart.

The group's second single, "You're Gorgeous", reached number 3 in the UK in October 1996, and was one of the biggest selling singles of the year, going on to chart around the world. However, it presented a more commercial face to the public in comparison to Jones's earlier work, as well as in comparison to the rest of the material on the Ugly Beautiful album. The album produced two more hit singles in "Candy Girl" and "Cornershop".

In 1997 the band returned to the studio, with producer Darren Allison. They recorded two new tracks - a brand new version of Bad Shave, and a re-working of CFC. These new tracks were included on the 1997 U.S.A. release of Ugly Beautiful.

Babybird returned, minus keyboardist Huw Chadbourn, in 1998 with There's Something Going On, preceded by a single, "Bad Old Man". The album was a modest success and was followed by further minor hits, "If You'll Be Mine" and "Back Together".

In 2000, a line-up of Babybird comprising Jones, Scott and Matt Hay created a third album. Bugged. Sales were poor and the two singles from it, "The F-Word" (later the theme tune to Gordon Ramsay's UK TV cookery show of the same name) and "Out of Sight" barely dented the charts. Babybird were dropped by their record label soon after. A third single from the album, "Fireflies" / "Getaway" was released on Animal Noise records, but sold few copies. The band subsequently split.

Jones went on to write fiction, release solo work and score a film, Blessed, in 2004. In October 2005, a posting on the Babybird website announced that the band had reformed as a three-piece featuring Jones, Scott and Robert Gregory. An album, Between My Ears There Is Nothing But Music was released on 25 September 2006.

Reformation 2006-2012, 2015-present

In August 2009, it was announced that the band would be doing a tour of four gigs in November 2009 to promote the album Ex-Maniac, which was  released in February 2010. The line-up consisted of Jones, Scott and Gregory, with a cameo appearance from long-term fan Johnny Depp on the track "Unloveable". Depp also directed the music video. The following year, Babybird released the album The Pleasures of Self Destruction.

In 2013, Stephen Jones announced via his Twitter feed that Babybird was no more. He launched his own site at Bandcamp, and released a number of albums under aliases such as "Black Reindeer", "Deluder", "Arthritis Kid", "The Great Sadness" and "Trucker".

In 2015, Jones started trading under the Babybird name again, reforming the band as a live unit in 2017 and in early 2019, toured as support to Dodgy with his new line-up. A number of Babybird tracks from 2015 onwards were released on 1 March 2019 as a compilation album 'Happy Stupid Nothing'  Just a few months later, it was announced that another album Photosynthesis would be released in July 2019. As well as these, Jones has been releasing a prolific amount of new Babybird albums via Bandcamp, often selling them as unique limited edition CDs.

Discography

Studio albums

Compilation albums

Live albums

Singles

Compilation tracks 
 "Bad Twin" (on The Avengers OST, Atlantic Records, August 1998)

Promotional videos 
 "Goodnight" (1996, directed by Stuart A. Gosling)
 "You're Gorgeous" (1997, directed by Stuart A. Gosling)
 "If You'll Be Mine" (1998, directed by David Slade)
 "The F-Word" (2000, directed by Rob Leggatt & Leigh Marling)
 "Out of Sight" (2000, directed by Rob Leggatt & Leigh Marling)
 "Lighter 'n' Spoon" (2008, directed by Philipp Pflüger)
 "Unloveable" (2010, directed by Johnny Depp)
 "King Of Nothing" (2019, directed by [RW/FF])
 "In Place Of Love" (2019, directed by [Stephen Jones])
 "The Greatest Thing" (2019, directed by [Stephen Jones and RW/FF])
 "No Cameras" (2019, directed by [RW/FF])

References

External links 
 Babybird website 
 Stephen Jones on Bandcamp

English indie rock groups
Musical groups from Sheffield
Musical groups established in 1995
1995 establishments in the United Kingdom